A smart aleck, also spelled smart alek or smart alec, is someone whose sarcastic, wisecracking, or humorous manner is delivered in an offensive, obnoxious, or cocky way.

Smart aleck may refer to: 

Smart Alecks, a 1942 film starring the East Side Kids
 Smart Alec (1951 US film), a 1951 US pornographic film starring Candy Barr
 Smart Alec (1951 UK film), a 1951 UK B-movie
 Smart Alec (1986 film), a 1986 film directed by Jim Wilson
Smart Alek, a 1993 film directed by Andrew Kötting
Smart Alex, a 1985 album by The Adicts
 Smart Alec (comics), a Marvel Comics super villain